NME (or New Musical Express) was a British weekly pop music newspaper. Record charts in the United Kingdom began life on 14 November 1952 when NME began compiling the first UK-wide sales-based hit parade. Prior to 15 February 1969, when the British Market Research Bureau chart was established, there was no one universally accepted source and many periodicals compiled their own chart. During this time the BBC used aggregated results of charts from the NME and other sources to compile the Pick of the Pops chart. In 1969, Record Retailer and the BBC commissioned the British Market Research Bureau (BMRB) to compile the singles chart.

Prior to this, The Official Charts Company and Guinness' British Hit Singles & Albums, consider Record Retailer the canonical source for the British singles chart in the 1960s; Nevertheless, in the 1960s, NME had the biggest circulation of charts in the decade and was more widely followed. After 1969, the joint venture between Record Retailer and the BBC is widely considered as the beginning of the official UK Singles Chart. NME continued compiling its own chart until 14 May 1988.

Significantly, NME had the Sex Pistols' anti-monarchy single "God Save the Queen" at number-one during the Silver Jubilee of Elizabeth II. The single, released by Virgin Records, was the highest-selling single of the week but had been banned by the BBC and some major retailers. To prevent it from reaching the top of the BMRB chart, for one week compilers "decreed that shops which sold their own records could not have those records represented in the chart", thus sales from Virgin Megastores were not counted. Despite reaching number-two on the official chart, it is sometimes referred to as reaching number one.

Number-one singles

Notes

References
Footnotes

Sources

Lists of number-one songs in the United Kingdom
New Musical Express
1970s in British music